José Díaz Morales (1908-1976) was a Spanish screenwriter and film director. He emigrated to Mexico following the outbreak of the Spanish Civil War.

Selected filmography

Director
 Jesus of Nazareth (1942)
 Adultery (1945)
 Life on a Thread (1945)
 Madam Temptation (1948)
 The Captain from Loyola (1949)
 The Troublemaker (1950)
 The Troublemaker (1963)

References

Bibliography
 Bentley, Bernard. A Companion to Spanish Cinema. Boydell & Brewer Ltd, 2008.

External links

1908 births
1976 deaths
Spanish male writers
Male screenwriters
Spanish film directors
People from Toledo, Spain
Spanish emigrants to Mexico
20th-century Spanish screenwriters
20th-century Spanish male writers